The Communauté de communes Coteaux et Châteaux was a communauté de communes in the Hérault département and in the Languedoc-Roussillon region of France.

It was created by prefectoral decision on December 31, 1997 and dissolved on January 1, 2013 upon merging with surrounding communauté de communes to form the Communauté de communes des Avant-Monts du Centre Hérault.

Etymology

The name "Coteaux et Châteaux" derives from the local coteaux (vineyards) and châteaux, both prominent in the countryside.

Communes

Coteaux et Châteaux comprised the following communes:

 Fos
 Gabian
 Margon
 Montesquieu
 Neffiès
 Pouzolles
 Roujan
 Vailhan

References

External links

Official Website 

Coteaux Et Chateaux